Elachista oxycrates is a moth in the family Elachistidae. It was described by Edward Meyrick in 1932. It is found in Sri Lanka.

References

Moths described in 1932
oxycrates
Moths of Asia